Paluch, Palluch, Palúch, Paľuch, Paľúch, or Palyukh are surnames of Polish, Slovak, and Ukrainian origin. "Paluch" means "big toe" in Polish. In Slovakia, the surname Palúch comes from the given name Pavol (Paul). It may refer to:

 Anna Paluch (born 1960), Polish politician
 Ewa Paluch, Polish-French biophysicist and cell biologist
 Ivan Palúch (1940–2015), Slovak actor
 Jean Palluch (1923–1971), French footballer
 Paulina Paluch (born 1998), Polish athlete
 Peter Palúch (born 1958), Slovak football player
 Scott Paluch (born 1966), American ice hockey player
 Serhiy Palyukh (born 1996), Ukrainian footballer
 Sławomir Paluch (born 1975), Polish footballer
 Walter P. Paluch, Jr. (1927–2011), Brigadier General in the United States Air Force

See also
 
 Paluchy, village in south-eastern Poland

References 

Polish-language surnames
Slovak-language surnames